Zathura is an action-adventure game developed by High Voltage Software and published by 2K Games for PlayStation 2 and Xbox in 2005. The game is based on the 2005 film Zathura: A Space Adventure, which, in turn, is an adaptation of the 2002 children's book Zathura by Chris Van Allsburg. The game was released on November 3, 2005, in the U.S. to coincide with the then-upcoming film's release on November 11. A Game Boy Advance version was planned, but was later canceled.

Reception

The game received "unfavorable" reviews on both platforms according to the review aggregation website Metacritic.

References

External links
 

2005 video games
2K games
Action-adventure games
Cancelled Game Boy Advance games
High Voltage Software games
PlayStation 2 games
Science fiction video games
Video games based on films
Video games developed in the United States
Xbox games
3D platform games